State Road 434 (SR 434) is a major roadway in the Central Florida area. Starting at SR 424 (Edgewater Drive) just north of Orlando city limits, the road runs north as Forest City Road through Forest City before dropping the name at the Seminole County line. SR 434 continues north and east through Altamonte Springs and Longwood before turning south and east through Winter Springs and Oviedo. SR 434 is called Central Avenue when it first turns south towards downtown Oviedo.  After going through downtown Oviedo, SR 434 is called Alafaya Trail from its intersection with Mitchell Hammock Road south to the Orange County line to its end at SR 50 (Colonial Drive). The road continues south as Alafaya Trail only without the state road designation. Alafaya meets with State Road 50 in Union Park, FL.

West of Oviedo SR 434 is signed east–west, south of Oviedo it is signed north–south.

Route description
In Seminole County, official maps show SR 434 as being named Sanlando Springs Road through Longwood and Sanford-Oviedo Road through Winter Springs. The road is referred to locally as simply State Road 434, Highway 434, Route 434 or just as 434.

SR 434 is called Alafaya Trail from Mitchell Hammock Road in Oviedo, continuing south into Orange County, to its end at SR 50 (Colonial Drive).  Alafaya Trail continues south of Colonial Drive without the SR 434 designation.

In the 1883 plat of Forest City Orange Park, a section of what is now SR 434 south of its intersection with SR 436 was named Bay Street.

History
SR 434 was defined in the 1945 renumbering as from a point on SR 436 South for approximately one mile then Northeast to Forest City, thence North and Northeasterly to Longwood, thence South to intersection with SR 436 East of Altamonte Springs; thence Southeasterly to intersection with SR 426 South of Gabriella.

SR 431 was defined as from a point on the old Orlando-Apopka Road near the N.E. corner of Section 4, T. 22 S - R. 29 E. Northerly to intersection with SR 436 at Forest City

The original route of SR 434 had it begin at SR 436 and Bear Lake Road, run south on Bear Lake Road, northeast on Bunnell Road, along the current SR 434 to Longwood, south on CR 427 and Anchor Road, southeast on current SR 436, south on Lake Howell Road, and east on Howell Branch Road to end at SR 426.

At some point, Alafaya Trail from Oviedo south to SR 50 was added as an extension of SR 520. Also around the same time, SR 434 west of Forest City and east of Longwood was removed, and SR 434's east end was extended to SR 419.

Eventually, around 1985, SR 434 was extended in both directions, south from the west end along SR 431 and east and south from the east end along SR 419 and SR 520 (which had, in the meantime, become County Road 520 on Alafaya Trail).

In 2013, a short extension of SR 434 opened, connecting the road directly to SR 423 (John Young Parkway) via a flyover bridge across U.S. Route 441 (US 441 or Orange Blossom Trail).  A major goal of this extension was to alleviate I-4 traffic.

The road reopened to traffic on June 8, 2018 after repairs were made.

Major intersections

References

External links

434
434
434